Jupiter LXIX, originally known as S/2017 J 8, is an outer natural satellite of Jupiter. It was discovered by Scott S. Sheppard and his team in 2017, but not announced until July 17, 2018, via a Minor Planet Electronic Circular from the Minor Planet Center. It is about 1 kilometer in diameter and orbits at a semi-major axis of about 23,232,700 km  with an inclination of about 164.7°. It belongs to the Carme group.

References

Carme group
Moons of Jupiter
Irregular satellites
Discoveries by Scott S. Sheppard
Astronomical objects discovered in 2017
Moons with a retrograde orbit